Porphyrius the Charioteer (Greek:), also named as Porphyrius Calliopas was a celebrity Byzantine-Roman charioteer in the late 5th and early 6th centuries of Imperial Rome's Christian era, during what Alan Cameron describes as the "Golden Age of the Charioteer". Christianisation of the Roman empire had been accompanied by the abandonment of traditional Roman and Greek religious festivals and the banning of gladiator shows and other arena blood-sports; venationes (wild beast hunts in the arena) were banned in 498. Chariot racing and certain forms of what Cameron describes as Imperial ritual, theatrical dance or "pantomime" replaced most imperially funded public entertainments. In 502, the theatrical or pantomime component was banned as unruly, leaving only such Imperial ritual as belonged to the chariot races, in particular the salutation of the emperor and victor.

Porphyrius was one of the most popular and celebrated charioteers of his day, with a forty-year career that probably spanned several cities of the Byzantine Empire. Seven inscriptions celebrating his achievements have been traced to the Hippodrome, the racetrack at the Byzantine Empire's capital, Constantinople. Each inscription was once associated with the base of a bronze portrait statue of Porphyrius, mounted on the race-track's central division (in Latin, Euripus or spina). All traces of the statues are now lost. Two bases survive; their imagery and inscriptions, supplemented by ancient transcriptions from the five lost bases, offer a record of the changing status, roles and alliances of Byzantine charioteers and racing factions. Porphyrius retired from chariot-racing in his late 50s or 60s; his age at death is not known.

Origins and sources
What little is known of Porphyrius and his history derives from the text on two statuary bases, and ancient copies of the text on five others, whose originals are now lost. The copies became part of the collection of epigrams, prose and poetry known as the Greek anthology. The Chronicle of John Malalas offers a different version of the text, presumed to be less reliable.

Porphyrius was born in Libya in 480 AD, the son of a certain Calchas, and brought up in Constantinople. He started his career quite young, in his early adolescence, and "he often changed factions and horses". In his later career, he adopted the name Porphyrius Calliopas. 

The two surviving sculpted plinths were awarded early in Porphyrius' career. They are the second and fourth in an attested total of seven, each of which would originally have supported a bronze portrait statue of Porphyrius. The incised legends on the surviving plinths, and the copies that were made from the lost plinths when still in situ, provide a biography. The two plinths have much imagery in common. Cameron sees a similarity between their iconography and that of the Obelisk of Theodosius plinth, one side of which shows the emperor, surrounded by his court in uniform rows, using the same confronting gesture as Porphyrius, as if to offer the viewer a winner's wreath; the other faces of the Theodosius plinth show ranks of submissive barbarians, vanquished enemies, an illustration of the race itself, and a performance by musicians and dancers. Porphyrius' plinths are around 7 feet high, with cartouches of Greek text and high relief, stylised portrayals of Tyches, and the charioteer's factional supporters. Porphyrius himself stands in triumphant posture in his quadriga (four horse chariot), acknowledging his victory and the adoration of his supporters. Cameron describes the figures as static, "stiff and ungainly", having no reference to the naturalistic imagery from the classical past. Porphyrius is the youngest known charioteer to have been honoured with monuments during his lifetime by both the Greens and the Blues - the two major, usually opposed factions - with the emperor's approval. Traditionally a charioteer would have a statue or other monument built after his retirement or death. 

Porphyrius is described in his inscriptions as the best charioteer of his time; and as the only charioteer known to have won the diversium twice in one day; however, Epigram 374 claims that the charioteer Constantine won 25 races in the morning, 21 of them by diversium. In a diversium, a winning charioteer won twice over, driving the horse team he had only just defeated; this was a clear demonstration of the driver's skill.  His most notable chariot-racing accomplishments were in the Hippodrome in Constantinople;

He raced for the Greens of Antioch in 507, and led them  to attack a synagogue in the suburb of Daphne, slaughtering many Jews. This is the sole activity known involving Porphyrius outside of the racing stadium. Cameron observes that "stars are notoriously temperamental, especially when fame comes early".

A fragment of Malalas' chronicle asserts that Porphyrius, as leader of the Greens, helped raise support for the ruling emperor, Anastasius during the general Vitalian's Revolt, and that subsequently the victorious and grateful Anastasius commissioned yet another Hippodrome statue of Porphyrius. Cameron allows for the possibility that Porphyrius fought in person for Anastasius, but also underlines Malalas' reputation as an unreliable historian.

References

Reviewed Work(s): Porphyrius the Charioteer by Alan Cameron. J. H. W. G. Liebeschuetz. The Journal of Roman Studies, Vol. 64, 1974 (1974), pp. 233–234
The Chronicles of John Malalas. Elizabeth Jeffreys, Michael Jeffreys, Roger Scott. Melbourne 1986
Reviewed Work: Porphyrius the Charioteer by Alan Cameron. Thomas W. Africa. The American Historical Review. Vol. 80, No. 2. (Apr., 1975), pp. 378–379·
The Monument of Porphyrius in the Hippodrome at Constantinople, A. A. Vasiliev. Dumbarton Oaks Papers, Vol. 4. (1948), pp. 27+29-49.
The Greek Anthology (English Translation). W.R. Paton. 1918
Porphyrius the Charioteer. Alan Cameron. Oxford University Press 1973

480 births
6th-century deaths
6th-century Byzantine people
Ancient chariot racing
Ancient Roman sportspeople
Year of birth unknown